Nika Amashukeli is a Georgian rugby union and World Rugby elite referee.

Background
In his early youth Nika Amashukeli played soccer. Nika watched his first ever full rugby match on TV during the 2007 Rugby World Cup, when his father "literally forced" him to watch Ireland v Georgia.

Nika started playing rugby for Jiki at the age of 11. He played as a flanker then inside centre, and as an outside centre for Georgia at U17, U18 and U19 levels. He was selected for Georgia U18 team for 2012 European Under-18 Rugby Union Championship. By the age of 20 he had already suffered 5 concussions. He’d also broken an ankle, and there was a knee problem. Head injuries affected his mental health at that time; eventually he decided to retire from playing.

Refereeing career
In 2013 Georgian Rugby Union started a program aimed at improving the standard of Georgian referees; a new relationship with IRFU has started. This included Irish referees regularly officiating Georgian domestic league matches, Georgian referees officiating All-Ireland League matches and attending IRFU workshops. Nika was among the first young referees recruited through this program in 2013. His first match in Ireland was between Old Christians and St Mary’s in the Munster Junior League.

Amashukeli made his test debut as a referee in the Montenegro v Estonia European Nations Cup Third Division match on 11 April 2015; he refereed the 1st half and was replaced by Shota Tevzadze at half-time.

In 2016 in an incident after a Georgian domestic league match between Batumi and Army Nika Amashukeli was stabbed in the leg with a knife by one of the Army club officials.

In 2019 he attracted rugby followers' attention when during the U20 Six Nations match he was temporarily substituted after a blood injury. Nika left the field, stitched the cutting and happily returned in 12 minutes to finish the match.

Highlight of Nika's career was 2019 World Rugby Under 20 Championship in Argentina, where World Rugby was highly impressed with emerging Georgian talent as afterwards he got appointments from Joël Jutge to referee in EPCR competitions. Nika himself admits that Joël Jutge had an invaluable positive influence on his career.

He was named as the best Georgian referee many times since 2013.

After working alongside Wayne Barnes during the Autumn Nations Cup in 2020, Nika rated Wayne Barnes as the number 1 referee in the world at the moment.

In 2020 Nika launched a Facebook page named "Rugby Laboratory" where he posts videos explaining basics of rugby laws to new supporters of the game.

In 2021 Nika had a successful debut in July internationals, having officiated on Wales v Canada match, first ever Georgian to do tier 1 nations game. His second match Romania v Scotland was called off due to COVID-19 restrictions. Nika's pathway continued through as he got top level appointments on November internationals, set to officiate in Ireland v Japan, French Barbarians v Tonga and Wales v Australia matches.

Nika is coached and mentored by David McHugh, who is employed by Georgian Rugby Union as a Head of Referees Committee. Nika Amashukeli claims that David McHugh has been the biggest influence on his career and changed the way he thinks. Amashukeli describes McHugh as a great guy, very professional, very friendly, strong and knowledgeable manager who makes a lot of effort to improve Didi 10 referees. According to Nika himself, McHugh is not only a coach for him, but also his friend.

As of February 2023, Nika Amashukeli is included in World Rugby's list of candidates to be a referee at the 2023 Rugby World Cup.

List of Tier 1 tests

Since 2021 Nika Amashukeli regularly gets appointed to prestigious test matches involving Tier 1 national teams. The list below includes all of his Tier 1 test appointments in Six Nations, Rugby Championship and international tours.

References

External links
 CRFC Fans profile
 World Rugby profile

Living people
1994 births
Six Nations Championship referees
EPCR Challenge Cup referees
European Rugby Champions Cup referees
United Rugby Championship referees
The Rugby Championship referees
Sportspeople from Tbilisi